Roberto Léon Richards (born 12 June 1954) is a Cuban gymnast. He competed at the 1972 Summer Olympics, the 1976 Summer Olympics and the 1980 Summer Olympics.

References

1954 births
Living people
Cuban male artistic gymnasts
Olympic gymnasts of Cuba
Gymnasts at the 1972 Summer Olympics
Gymnasts at the 1976 Summer Olympics
Gymnasts at the 1980 Summer Olympics
People from Cárdenas, Cuba
Pan American Games medalists in gymnastics
Pan American Games gold medalists for Cuba
Pan American Games silver medalists for Cuba
Gymnasts at the 1975 Pan American Games
Gymnasts at the 1979 Pan American Games
Gymnasts at the 1983 Pan American Games
Medalists at the 1975 Pan American Games
Medalists at the 1979 Pan American Games
Medalists at the 1983 Pan American Games
21st-century Cuban people
20th-century Cuban people